Gren may refer to

Gren, the pen-name of cartoonist Grenfell "Gren" Jones
Gren (band)
Gren (name)
Gren automotive, an international manufacturer of automotive brake components
Piz Gren, a mountain of the Swiss Lepontine Alps
Wenner-Gren Center in Vasastaden, Stockholm
Ivan Gren-class landing ship